Abadla is a district in Béchar Province, Algeria. It was named after its capital, Abadla. According to the 2008 census, the total population of the district was 21,133 inhabitants. Most of the population of the region is clustered around the Oued Guir, the main water source for the district. The N6 national highway runs through the district on its way from Béchar to Adrar; the N50 branches off near Abadla, leading to Tindouf.

Municipalities
The district is further divided into three communes:
Abadla
Méchraâ Houari Boumédienne
Erg Ferradj

References

Districts of Béchar Province